Donner Pass: The Road to Survival is a 1978 American historical drama television film about the Donner Party, directed by James L. Conway, written by S. S. Schweitzer, and produced by Schick Sunn Classic Pictures as a part of their Classics Illustrated series. It aired on NBC on October 24, 1978.

Plot
A grim incident from American pioneer history is recreated as a determined group of settlers, facing almost insurmountable odds, struggles to reach California in 1846.

Cast
 Robert Fuller as James Reed
 Andrew Prine as Keyser
 Michael Callan as William Eddy
 Diane McBain as Margaret Reed
 KJohn Anderson as Patrick Breen
 John Doucette as George Donner
 Cynthia Eilbacher as Mary Graves
 Royal Dano as John Sutter
 Gregory Walcott as Will Mckutcheon
 Lance Le Gault as Charles Stanton
 Whit Bissell as Uncle Billy Graves
 Peg Stewart as Mrs. Breen

Release
Donner Pass: The Road to Survival was shown on prime time television on NBC on October 24, 1978. The film was released on VHS on October 20, 1992, by Anchor Bay Entertainment.

Reception
Film critic Kevin Thomas of the Los Angeles Times called it "gruelling to watch".

References

External links

1978 television films
1978 films
1978 drama films
1970s adventure drama films
1970s English-language films
1970s historical adventure films
1970s historical drama films
Adventure films based on actual events
Adventure television films
American films based on actual events
American adventure drama films
American drama television films
American historical adventure films
American historical drama films
American survival films
Donner Party
Drama films based on actual events
Films about cannibalism
Films directed by James L. Conway
Films set in California
Films set in 1846
Films shot in Arizona
Films shot in Utah
Historical television films
NBC network original films
Television films based on actual events
1970s American films